The naturalization of value systems in the human sciences is the process by which other frameworks were sought to replace spiritual, "other-worldly", religious explanations of nature, life and humanity with respect to fundamental values.

References

External links
The Naturalization of Value Systems in the Human Sciences by Young, Robert M.

Humanities